Boy in da Corner is the debut studio album by English rapper and producer Dizzee Rascal. It was first released on 21 July 2003 by XL Recordings in the United Kingdom before being released the following year in the United States.

A widespread critical success, Boy in da Corner became one of the most acclaimed records of 2003 and went on to win the Mercury Prize for best album from the UK and Ireland. It also peaked at number 23 on the British albums chart and sold over 250,000 copies worldwide by 2004. With the album's success, Dizzee Rascal gave mainstream exposure to grime music while becoming the UK's first internationally recognised rap star.

Background
Around the age of 14, Dizzee Rascal became an amateur drum and bass DJ, also rapping over tracks as customary in sound system culture, and making occasional appearances on local pirate radio stations. Two years on, aged 16, he self-produced his first single, "I Luv U", which was included on his debut. The same year, Rascal signed a solo deal with the record label XL.

Critical reception

Boy in da Corner received widespread acclaim from critics. At Metacritic, the album received an aggregate score of 92 out of 100, based on 28 reviews. NME called it "one of the most assured debut albums of the last five years". Entertainment Weekly stated that, "Combining U.K. garage beats and a distinctly British sensibility, Rascal spits out phrases with the energy and finesse of a championship boxer". Rolling Stone wrote, "If you want a vision of the future of hip-hop and techno, get this record". AllMusic called it "Startling, tirelessly powerful, and full of unlimited dimensions, nothing could truly weigh down this debut". Pitchforks Scott Plagenhoef stated, "Dizzee's despairing wail, focused anger, and cutting sonics places him on the front lines in the battle against a stultifying Britain, just as Pete Townshend, Johnny Rotten, and Morrissey have been in the past". In The Village Voice, Robert Christgau wrote that "His adolescent gulps and yowls are street-Brit with a Jamaican liquidity, as lean, eccentric, and arresting as the beats." Fellow Village Voice critic Jeff Chang stated, "When Dizzee thinks very deeply—worrying about growing up, about those around him who won't grow up, about dying before he grows up—he sounds like, what else can we call it, the real thing". Stylus Magazine stated, "Most of Boy in Da Corner's most compelling moments come from this uneasy interaction between irrational youth and ultra-rational mechanized society". Alexis Petridis from The Guardian called Dizzee "the most original and exciting artist to emerge from dance music in a decade".

According to Acclaimed Music, Boy in da Corner was the third most ranked record on critics' year-end lists of the year's best albums and eventually the 369th most ranked on subsequent all-time lists. It won Dizzee Rascal the 2003 Mercury Prize, an annual music award for the best album from the United Kingdom and Ireland, making him the second rapper to win the award. In 2009, it was voted the sixth greatest album of all time by MTV Base. The album was included in the book 1001 Albums You Must Hear Before You Die. According to B.J. Steiner from Complex, "Boy in Da Corner brought grime—an influential subgenre of hip-hop birthed from the endless creativity of a bunch of kids from the United Kingdom—to the rest of the world and made a young Dizzee Rascal, his country's first international rap superstar."

Commercial performance
Boy in da Corner was released on 21 July 2003 in the United Kingdom by XL Recordings and 20 January 2004 in the United States by Matador Records. It reached number twenty-three on the UK Albums Chart and was certified gold by the British Phonographic Industry (BPI), having shipped 100,000 copies there. By 2004, it had sold over 250,000 copies worldwide, and over 58,000 copies in the US by 2007. The album was certified Platinum (300,000 copies) in July 2018, 15 years after its release, making it Dizzee's second Platinum selling album after Tongue n' Cheek.

Legacy
In 2016, Dizzee Rascal performed Boy in da Corner in full for the first time first in New York and then in east London at the Copper Box Arena. Contemporary critics praised the album's continuing influence on grime and ageless sound. In late 2016, a bootleg fan mixtape of rare recordings from the Boy in Da Corner era called Left in da Corner was released.

Track listing
All tracks were produced by Dizzee Rascal, except where noted.

Notes
 "Stop Dat" features background vocals by Armour of N.A.S.T.Y. Crew
 "I Luv U" features additional vocals by Jeanine Jacques
 "Wot U On?" features additional vocals by Caramel
 "Seems 2 Be" features additional vocals by Claire Cottrell

Sample credits
 "Fix Up, Look Sharp" includes a sample of "The Big Beat", performed by Billy Squier.

Personnel
The album's credits are adapted from AllMusic.

 Armour – background vocals
 Gareth Bayliss – sleeve design assistant
 Caramel – vocals
 Dean Chalkley – sleeve photo
 Chubby Dread – producer
 Claire Cottrell – vocals
 Nick Detnon – A&R
 Ben Drury – cover design, logo design
 God's Gift – performer
 Nick Huggett – artist coordination
 Dylan Mills – composer
 Tesmond Rowe – composer
 Vanguard Vardoen – composer
 Wiley – performer

Charts

Weekly charts

Year-end charts

References

External links
 Boy in da Corner at Acclaimed Music (list of accolades)
 

2003 debut albums
Dizzee Rascal albums
Mercury Prize-winning albums
XL Recordings albums